KHKY may refer to:

 KHKY (FM), a radio station (92.7 FM) licensed to serve Akiachak, Alaska, United States
 Hickory Regional Airport (ICAO code KHKY)